Wiesbach is a river of Hesse, Germany. It flows into the Usa near Usingen-Kransberg.

See also
List of rivers of Hesse

References

Rivers of Hesse
Rivers of the Taunus
Rivers of Germany